Jansen Tosh Owen (born July 2, 1993) is an American attorney and politician, representing the 106th district in the Mississippi House of Representatives since 2020.

Early life and education 
Owen was born on July 2, 1993 in Hattiesburg, Mississippi and attended Poplarville High School.<ref>name="foo">http://billstatus.ls.state.ms.us/members/house/owen.xml</ref</ref> Afterwards, he enrolled at Pearl River Community College, where he graduated with an associate's degree. He then earned a bachelor's degree in political science from the University of Southern Mississippi. Owen received his Juris Doctor from Tulane University Law School in New Orleans, Louisiana in 2019, where he served as a managing editor of the Tulane Law Review. He was admitted to The Mississippi Bar in 2019 and practices law in Poplarville, Mississippi.

In 2016, Owen enlisted in the Mississippi Army National Guard and later commissioned as a judge advocate.

Career 
Owen challenged incumbent Representative John Glen Corley in the Republican Primary election in 2019. In the primary election, Owen ran against incumbent Corley and two others: Gregory Holcomb, a local attorney, and Ben Winston, the former Mayor of Lumberton, Mississippi. Owen placed first in the Republican Primary election on August 6, 2019, garnering 41.5% of the vote to Corley's 30.6%. He defeated Corley with 60.4% of the vote in the runoff election on August 27, 2019 and faced no opposition in the general election.

He was sworn into office on January 3, 2020 and is the youngest currently serving member of the Mississippi Legislature.

For the 2021 House session, Owen serves on the following committees: Apportionment and Elections, Transportation, Judiciary B, Agriculture, and Youth and Family Affairs.

Electoral record

Political positions 
During the 2019 election, Owen campaigned on reducing tax and regulatory burdens, combating public corruption by increasing government transparency, and cutting wasteful spending.

In 2020, Owen voted yes on the bill to change the Mississippi State Flag.

Personal life 
Owen is married to his wife Colbie Owen and has two sons.

References 

21st-century American politicians
University of Southern Mississippi alumni
People from Hattiesburg, Mississippi
1993 births
Living people
Republican Party members of the Mississippi House of Representatives
21st-century American women politicians